Skudenes is a former municipality in Rogaland county, Norway.  It was part of the traditional district of Haugaland. The  municipality existed from 1838 until its dissolution in 1965. The administrative centre was the town of Skudeneshavn (which technically was a separate municipality). The municipality originally encompassed land that is now part of the municipalities of Bokn and Karmøy. It included the southern part of the island of Karmøy and the three islands to the east: Vestre Bokn, Austre Bokn, and Ognøya. In 1849, the three smaller islands were separated to form Bokn municipality.

Today, the Skudenes area refers to the southern part of Karmøy island. In 2009, there were about 3,226 inhabitants.

History
The parish of Skudesnæs was established as a municipality on 1 January 1838 (see formannskapsdistrikt law). In 1849, the three islands of Vestre Bokn, Austre Bokn, and Ognøya (population: 1,035) were separated from Skudenes to form the municipality of Bukken. The split left Skudenes with a population of 5,044.

In 1857, the port village of Skudeneshavn on the southern tip of the island of Karmøy was designated as a ladested (a port of lading). Shortly thereafter, on 10 February 1858, Skudeneshavn (population: 1,209) was separated from Skudenes municipality, constituting a municipality of its own. The split left Skudenes with a population of 5,044. On 1 January 1892 the northern part of Skudenes was split off to form the new municipality of Åkra (population: 1,962).

On 1 January 1965, there were many municipal mergers in Norway as a result of the Schei Committee's work.  On that date, Skudenes municipality (population: 3,583) was merged with the neighboring municipalities of Avaldsnes, Stangaland, Torvastad, and Åkra and with the towns of Kopervik and Skudeneshavn to form the new municipality of Karmøy.

Government
All municipalities in Norway, including Skudenes, are responsible for primary education (through 10th grade), outpatient health services, senior citizen services, unemployment and other social services, zoning, economic development, and municipal roads.  The municipality is governed by a municipal council of elected representatives, which in turn elects a mayor.

Municipal council
The municipal council  of Skudenes was made up of 17 representatives that were elected to four year terms.  The party breakdown of the final municipal council was as follows:

See also
List of former municipalities of Norway

References

Karmøy
Bokn
Former municipalities of Norway
1838 establishments in Norway
1965 disestablishments in Norway